Jackson Buildings, also known as the Standard Grocery/Capital Furnace, were two historic commercial buildings located at Indianapolis, Indiana.  One was a four-story brick building built about 1882–83, and the other, a five-story building built about 1923. The older building exhibited Italianate and Beaux-Arts style design elements. The buildings housed a variety of commercial enterprises, including the Standard Grocery Company. The two buildings were demolished and replaced by a bank building.

The buildings were listed on the National Register of Historic Places in 1984 and delisted in 1993.

References

Former National Register of Historic Places in Indiana
Commercial buildings on the National Register of Historic Places in Indiana
Italianate architecture in Indiana
Beaux-Arts architecture in Indiana
Commercial buildings completed in 1883
Buildings and structures in Indianapolis
National Register of Historic Places in Indianapolis